Dylan John Fergus (born January 4, 1980, in San Francisco, California), is an American actor, producer and director. Fergus is currently a producer at Casual Films. He is best known for his role as Noah Bennett on the daytime soap opera Passions.

Biography
Prior to Passions, he briefly portrayed the role of Tim Dillon on All My Children in 2002. He also starred in 2004's Hellbent, the first gay slasher horror film. Fergus studied acting at Carnegie Mellon School Of Drama, graduating in 2002 and filmmaking at CalArts School of Film/Video. He graduated from Monta Vista High School in Cupertino, California in 1998.

References

External links
 Official Website
 On the River Entertainment Official Website
 Official Passions Profile

1980 births
Living people
Male actors from San Francisco
People from Cupertino, California
American male soap opera actors